Cheryl Lou "Cheri" Bjerkan (born 29 June 1947) is an American bridge player. She has won 14 North American Bridge Championships and one world championship.

Bjerkan is from Elmhurst, Illinois. She lives in the Chicago area.

Bjerkan won the women's individual championship at the 2013 SportAccord World Mind Games.

Bridge accomplishments

Wins
 Venice Cup (1) 1987 
 North American Bridge Championships (14)
 Whitehead Women's Pairs (2) 1992, 2002 
 Smith Life Master Women's Pairs (1) 2011 
 Machlin Women's Swiss Teams (5) 1984, 1987, 1991, 1997, 2008 
 Wagar Women's Knockout Teams (4) 1989, 1992, 1996, 2002 
 Sternberg Women's Board-a-Match Teams (1) 1991 
 Chicago Mixed Board-a-Match (1) 1998

Runners-up

 North American Bridge Championships
 Smith Life Master Women's Pairs (2) 1991, 2013 
 Machlin Women's Swiss Teams (1) 2004 
 Wagar Women's Knockout Teams (7) 1978, 1979, 1981, 1986, 1990, 1993, 2009

References

External links
 

1947 births
American contract bridge players
Venice Cup players
People from Elmhurst, Illinois
Living people
Place of birth missing (living people)